Giovanni Pablo Simeone Baldini (born 5 July 1995) is an Argentine professional footballer who plays as a striker for Serie A club Napoli, on loan from Hellas Verona, and the Argentina national team.

Early life
The son of former Argentine international footballer Diego Simeone and Carolina Baldini, Giovanni Simeone was born in Buenos Aires, Argentina, while his father was playing for Atlético Madrid.

His family moved to Italy in 1997, but later returned to Spain in 2003 following his father's career club changes. Two years later he moved to Argentina, and joined River Plate's youth setup in 2008 when his father was appointed coach of the first team. He has two younger brothers, Gianluca and Giuliano, both footballers.

Club career

River Plate
After progressing through the youth ranks, Simeone signed a three-year professional deal with the club in November 2011. In July 2013, he was called up by the main squad for the pre-season; Simeone made his league debut on 4 August 2013, starting and playing the full 90 minutes in a 1–0 away defeat against Gimnasia La Plata. Later that month he renewed his contract, signing until 2016. Simeone scored his first professional goal on 8 September, netting the second of a 3–0 home win against Tigre.

Loan to Banfield
On 6 July 2015, Simeone joined fellow Argentine Primera División side Banfield on a season-long loan deal. On 12 July 2015, he scored the match-winning goal on his debut in a 1–0 victory against Quilmes.

Genoa
On 18 August 2016, Simeone signed for Italian club Genoa for €3 million. He scored his first goal, on his first start for the club, in a 1–1 draw with Pescara on 25 September 2016. On 27 November, Simeone netted a brace in Genoa 3–1 win over Serie A leaders Juventus.

Fiorentina
Among speculation of Atlético Madrid's interest in signing the young player to be coached by his father Diego Simeone, Giovanni signed with Serie A club Fiorentina on 16 August 2017, for an undisclosed fee. On 29 April 2018, Simeone scored his first hat-trick in Fiorentina's 3–0 league win against Napoli.

Cagliari
On 30 August 2019, Simeone joined Cagliari on a year-long loan deal from Fiorentina, including an obligatory purchase clause at the end of the period. On 1 September, he made his debut in a 2–1 defeat against Inter Milan. Simeone's first goal came on 15 September, in a 3–1 win against Parma. After an inconsistent first part of the season, he scored in four consecutive games upon returning from the COVID-19 lockdown; he finished the seasons with 12 goals overall.

In the following season, Simeone scored a brace in a 3–2 win against Torino; he ended the 2020–21 season with six goals scored.

Hellas Verona
On 26 August 2021, Simeone joined Serie A side Hellas Verona on a season-long loan deal with an option to make the deal permanent. On 24 October, he scored all four goals in a 4–1 win over Lazio. It was his second hat-trick in Serie A, and both came against sides managed by Maurizio Sarri. On 30 October, Simeone netted two goals against Juventus, for the second time in his career, as Verona won 2–1. 

On 17 June 2022, he joined Hellas Verona on a permanent deal with a contract lasting until 2026.

Loan to Napoli
On 18 August 2022, Simeone joined Napoli on a season-long loan with an option to buy. On 7 September, he scored a goal on his Champions League debut in a 4–1 victory over Liverpool, in which he celebrated his goal by bursting into tears and kissing a tattoo of the Champions League logo which he got at the age of 13.

International career
Simeone holds both Argentine and Spanish nationality, as well as carrying Italian ancestry, but represents Argentina internationally. Capped for Argentina at under-20 level, Simeone finished as top scorer at the 2015 South American Youth Football Championship, helping Argentina win its fifth title in the competition.

On 8 September 2018, Simeone scored on his senior international debut, in a 3–0 friendly win over Guatemala in Los Angeles.
He was part of a team that won the friendly Adidas Cup against Mexico in November 2018.

Style of play
Simeone is an elegant yet powerful and opportunistic forward with an eye for goal, who is capable of playing anywhere along the front line; although he has been deployed as a second striker, he has also been used in a central role as a main striker, and is a competent and efficient finisher with both feet, despite being naturally right footed.

A tenacious and energetic player, he is known for his work-rate and defensive contribution off the ball, and often drops into midfield in order to help his team win back possession. He is also known for his speed and intelligent attacking movement, which enables him to create space and provide depth for his team.

Regarded as a promising young player, he also possesses good technical skills, as well as flair and finesse on the ball, and is capable of linking-up with his teammates and bringing other forwards into play.

Personal life 
On 1 January 2014, aged 18, Simeone obtained Spanish citizenship. On May 25, 2022 he married the Italian model Giulia Coppini in the church of San Salvatore al Monte (Florence).

Career statistics

Club

International

Scores and results list Argentina's goal tally first, score column indicates score after each Simeone goal.

Honours
River Plate
 Argentine Primera División: 2014 Final
 Copa Campeonato: 2014
 Copa Sudamericana: 2014

Argentina U20
 South American Youth Football Championship: 2015

Individual
 South American Youth Football Championship Top Goalscorer: 2015
 Serie A Player of the Month: October 2021

References

External links
 ESPN Deportes profile 
 
 Giovanni Simeone at Topforward
 

1995 births
Living people
Footballers from Madrid
Citizens of Argentina through descent
Argentine footballers
Argentine people of Italian descent
Naturalised citizens of Spain
Association football forwards
CF Rayo Majadahonda players
Club Atlético River Plate footballers
Club Atlético Banfield footballers
Genoa C.F.C. players
ACF Fiorentina players
Cagliari Calcio players
Hellas Verona F.C. players
S.S.C. Napoli players
Argentine Primera División players
Serie A players
Argentina under-20 international footballers
Olympic footballers of Argentina
Argentina international footballers
2015 South American Youth Football Championship players
Footballers at the 2016 Summer Olympics
Argentine expatriate footballers
Argentine expatriate sportspeople in Italy
Expatriate footballers in Italy
Simeone family